The Baltic Way mathematical contest has been organized annually since 1990, usually in early November, to commemorate the Baltic Way demonstration of 1989. Unlike most international mathematical competitions, Baltic Way is a true team contest. Each team consists of five secondary-school students, who are allowed and expected to collaborate on the twenty problems during the four and a half hours of the contest.

Originally, the three Baltic states participated, but the list of invitees has since grown to include all countries around the Baltic Sea; Germany sends a team representing only its northernmost parts, and Russia a team from St. Petersburg. Iceland is invited on grounds of being the first state to recognize the newfound independence of the Baltic states. Extra "guest" teams are occasionally invited at the discretion of the organizers: Israel was invited in 2001, Belarus in 2004 and 2014, Belgium in 2005, South Africa in 2011, the Netherlands in 2015 and Ireland in 2021. Responsibility for organizing the contest circulates among the regular participants.

History

Notes

External links and references

Problems, solutions, results and links (some of them broken) to web sites 1990-2010

Baltic Way contest web sites

Problems

European student competitions
Mathematics_competitions
Recurring events established in 1990